XPO may refer to:

Expo MRT station, Singapore (MRT station abbreviation)
Frisky Dingo#Episodes
Interpol
XPO Logistics
 Chi Rho Omicron (XPO), a Filipino based fraternity on the West Coast